Pop Heiress is the third album by the band Chainsaw Kittens, released in 1994.

Recording
Pop Heiress was produced by John Agnello over five weeks at NRG Studios and Kiva West Studios in North Hollywood and Encino, Calif., respectively. According to Tyson Meade:

Critical reception
Trouser Press wrote that "Pop Heiress is the Kittens’ finest album, thanks to a combination of strong hooks, masterful production (by John Agnello) and the confidence that goes with such assets." The Washington Post stated: "From the delirious drama of 'Dive Into the Sea' to the T. Rexy shuffle of 'I Ride Free' to the punky attack of 'Sore on the Floor' and 'Burn You Down,' this is the Kittens' most consistent outing."

Track listing
"Sore on the Floor" – 3:11
"Loneliest China Place" – 3:22
"Pop Heiress Dies" – 3:49
"Closet Song" – 2:37
"Dive Into the Sea" – 5:54
"Burn You Down" – 2:31
"I Ride Free" – 4:30
"Silver Millionaire" – 2:54
"Media Star Hymn" – 3:27
"Soldier on My Shoulder" – 4:18
"Justine Find Heaven" – 4:27
"We're Like..." – 6:01

Personnel
Tyson Meade - vocals, guitar
Trent Bell - guitar
Matt Johnson - bass
Eric Harmon - drums

References

External links
 "Pop Heiress Dies" video

Chainsaw Kittens albums
Albums produced by John Agnello